Universal basic income is a subject of much interest in the United Kingdom. There is a long history of discussion yet it has not been implemented to date. Interest in and support for universal basic income has increased substantially amongst the public and politicians in recent years.

Political parties that include universal basic income on their agenda include: the Green Party of England and Wales, the Scottish National Party (SNP), the Scottish Greens and the Liberal Democrats. Support for universal basic income is widespread amongst opposition politicians, including Labour, SNP, Liberal Democrats and Plaid Cymru, many of whom were among the 170 MPs and Lords who signed a proposal calling on the government to introduce a universal basic income during the coronavirus pandemic.

A public poll by YouGov in 2020 found that in the view of coronavirus pandemic 51% of the public in the United Kingdom support a universal basic income, with 24% unsupportive. A public petition on the UK government website that ran for six months from 16 March 2020 to 16 September 2020 calling for universal basic income during the course of the COVID-19 pandemic in the United Kingdom raised over 114,000 signatures.

History (from Thomas Paine to the year 2000)

Thomas Paine: Agrarian Justice 

Thomas Paine, an English-American philosopher and revolutionary, proposed a system whereby all citizens, when reaching adulthood, should be given an equal amount of money from the state. The idea was developed in Agrarian Justice, published 1797. The basic philosophical idea behind the proposal, explained in the book, was the contention that in the state of nature, "the earth, in its natural uncultivated state... was the common property of the human race". His contemporary and fellow pamphleteer, Thomas Spence, responded with a proposal that more closely fits the contemporary definition of basic income.

Speenhamland 

The Speenhamland system was a form of poverty relief in England at the end of the 18th century and during the early 19th century. It started in the village of Speenhamland, but soon spread to most parts of the country. William Pitt the Younger tried to have the system implemented nationally but failed. Although it has one similarity to basic income, in that theoretically everyone was eligible, it was means-tested and it included work conditions and supervision that made it very different from basic income.

1920s and 1930s

Even though basic income and related ideas had been proposed a few times before the 1920s (most notably Bertrand Russell in 1918), it was not until then that a social movement seems to have started around the idea. Valter Van Trier has described this movement, which started in United Kingdom, in his book Every One A King.

The idea of basic income was revived prominently by Dennis Milner and his wife Mabel Milner in their pamphlet Scheme for a State Bonus: A rational method of solving the social problem published in 1918. Following this publication, the so-called "State Bonus League was formed in july of the same year. The League pushed the idea inside the Labour Party, which dedicated several hearings at the National Congress in 1920 and 1922, but the idea was eventually rejected.

At the same time Major C.H. Douglas, a British engineer and social philosopher, developed a new economic philosophy which he labelled Social Credit. At the heart of the philosophy was a firm belief in the importance of individual freedom, but also that the monetary system had to be changed so that the market system could function properly. In short he combined monetary reform and basic income.

1940s 
The Beveridge report, published in 1942, stated that social insurances should be the main system in society for economic security. Besides that the report also proposed a selective system for those without access to social insurances. Beveridge himself did not like means-testing and selectivism, because it created high marginal tax rates for the poor, but he nevertheless thought that it was a necessary complement. After the war the "Beveridge-model" became the guiding principle for the welfare state, both in Britain and internationally. Lady Juliet Rhys Williams proposed the "New Social Contract" as an alternative to the Beveridge Report. In short she proposed basic income in the form of a negative income tax, except that she also recommended a work test.

1950s – 2000 
In 1972 the Cabinet of Edward Heath put forward a proposal for a tax-credit scheme which resembled a citizen's income in some ways but did not cover the whole of the population. In 1979 child benefit which is a citizen's income for children in all but name was introduced.

Contemporary debate and development (2000–present) 

A system of universal basic income is supported by the Green Party of England and Wales, the Scottish National Party and the Scottish Greens. For a period the Liberal Democrats also accepted it as official policy, but modified their support before members voted to adopt it as party policy in September 2020.

In January 2016, the sole MP of the Green Party of England and Wales, Caroline Lucas, tabled a motion in the British Parliament, calling on the Government to commission research into the effects of a universal basic income and examine its feasibility to replace the UK's existing social security system.

Former Shadow Chancellor John McDonnell is said to be a supporter of universal basic income and on 16 February 2016 said that universal basic income is "an idea we want to look at". Writing in The New Statesman on 17 February, Labour MP Jonathan Reynolds argues in its favour, (1) as a policy for coping with "inevitable but fundamental economic change," (2) as an alternative to "the bewildering complexity of our welfare system" when "people move frequently into and out of work", and (3) as a "platform from which [people] might fulfil their potential". Labour Party MP, Clive Lewis, has also stated his support for universal basic income.

In March 2020, a combined total of over 170 opposition politicians from MPs and Lords, called for the UK government to implement a universal basic income during the coronavirus pandemic in the United Kingdom. However, the Conservative government and then Chancellor of the Exchequer, Rishi Sunak, both rejected the calls.

On 25 September 2020, the Liberal Democrats adopted at their party conference a policy of supporting UBI.

In mid-May 2021, after the 2021 Senedd election in which Welsh Labour won half the seats in the Welsh Parliament, Mark Drakeford, leader of Welsh Labour and First Minister of Wales, announced that a universal basic income scheme would be trialled in Wales. Plaid Cymru supported a Welsh pilot for a universal basic income in their manifesto going into the election and the Welsh Liberal Democrats also made an election commitment to support a trial, while the Welsh Conservatives rejected the idea.

In a poll of 2,184 adults in Great Britain in November 2021 by Savanta ComRes, 44% of respondents stated their support for a universal basic income, compared to 23% who stated that they oppose it.

Recent reports 
In 2015 the London-based RSA (Royal Society for the encouragement of Arts, Manufactures and Commerce) launched its own proposal for Basic Income entitled Creative Citizens, Creative State. It advocated replacing a swathe of UK means-tested benefits with a single universal payment as a response to the changing landscape of work and an ageing population.

In March 2019, the New Economics Foundation (NEF) produced the report Nothing Personal: Replacing the personal tax allowance with a Weekly National Allowance. The report maintained that  if the Government abolished the personal allowance of income tax and replaced it with a weekly cash payment of £48 a week it could lift 200,000 families out of poverty. The proposed policy swap would shift £8bn currently spent on tax allowances for the 35% highest income families to the remaining 65% of families. However, the report was critical of the notion of a universal basic income, ie, a guaranteed income for all citizens.

Approximately a week after the report by the NEF, the think tank Compass published a report written by economists Stewart Lansley and Howard Reed. Entitled Basic Income for All: From Desirability to Feasibility it suggested the government could make tax-free payments of £60 to every adult, £175 for those over 65 and £40 for each child under 18, regardless of other income. This would be designed to cut rising levels of poverty and inequality across the United Kingdom. Their report suggested the cost of reworking the tax and benefits system would be £28bn, less than the aggregate cuts to benefits since 2010 and the changes would return social security spending back to the level of a decade ago to help cover the costs of the UBI. Lansley and Reed followed up this report with a second in 2019, that took a closer look at the financial possibilities of universal basic income in the UK. In Basic Income for All: From Desirability to Feasibility, Lansley and Reed claim that "a meaningful basic income of, for example, over £10,000 per year could be paid to a family of four. Sums at this level, paid without condition, would significantly improve the living standards and life chances of millions of people and ... are affordable."

In May 2019, a report by Professor Guy Standing, commissioned by the Progressive Economic Forum and forwarded to John McDonnell (the acting Shadow Chancellor of the Exchequer) suggested different models for piloting basic income. Standing's report (Basic Income as Common Dividends: Piloting a Transformative Policy. A Report for the Shadow Chancellor of the Exchequer) cites a "perfect storm" of factors that lead to the need for a basic income: Broad ethical justifications for basic income, which Standing cites as "social justice, security, freedom and solidarity"  are now working in combination with urgent socio-economic demands. "A growing proportion of people," the report states, "are in the precariat, living bits-and-pieces lives, relying on low wages and incomes that are increasingly volatile and unpredictable and on inadequate and uncertain benefits in times of loss of earnings power." Echoing William Beveridge's 1942 report suggesting the need for a Welfare State in the UK, Standing states there are eight modern giants, stretching form inequality, debt through to neo-fascism, that basic income could help tackle. The report is also highly critical of current UK welfare schemes, mainly Universal Credit, which he states are unfair for large families, have high administrative costs and limit personal freedom.

The report deals with the most common objections to a basic income. To the objection that basic income is not affordable, Professor Standing said there are 1,156 tax reliefs in the UK at the moment and if they were scrapped that would pay for a basic income. "If we phased out those tax reliefs the total revenue foregone by the Treasury from tax reliefs is £420bn per year and that's their own estimates, not mine," he added. He also suggests "a more general Commons Permanent Fund, in which a national investment fund would be built mainly from levies on commercial intrusions into the commons, boosted by contributions from a land-value tax, eco taxes, digital information levies and several others."

Proposed pilots 
There are currently no regional universal basic income pilots running in the UK. However, some proposals have been made. In 2018, the Scottish Government agreed to provide 250,000 GBP to assess the feasibility of a universal basic income pilot in four areas: Glasgow, Edinburgh and the regions of Fife and North Ayrshire. The feasibility study will be completed in September 2019, and the government will then decide how best to proceed with a pilot in the four areas. The Royal Society for the Encouragement of Arts, Manufactures and Commerce has also produced a report examining some of the benefits and challenges of a basic income system in the region of Fife. And in 2019, the council of Sheffield agreed to work on ensuring that "UBI can be implemented successfully in Sheffield”. The council of Liverpool has also shown enthusiasm for experimenting with a basic income.

In October 2020, Wales' Future Generations Commissioner Sophie Howe recommended that a universal basic income and a shorter working week should be piloted by the next Welsh Government.

Critics 
There are also several critics on both the right and left of British politics. The former Conservative MP Nick Boles said in 2017 that talk of a universal basic income as a response to the rise of robots is "dangerous nonsense". The main argument against basic income for the Conservatives, he said, should be that it is morally wrong. In his forthcoming book "Square Deal" he writes: "Mankind is hard-wired to work. We gain satisfaction from it. It gives us a sense of identity, purpose and belonging … we should not be trying to create a world in which most people do not feel the need to work." 

Ian Goldin, Professor of Globalisation and Development at the University of Oxford, has written against UBI claiming it "will lead to higher inequality and poverty" and "undermine social cohesion." Various left-wing pressure groups and think tanks share such suspicions. A report by DPAC (Disabled People Against Cuts) consider that "the need to finance universal basic income payments could lead to even more pressure to save money by restricting eligibility [for welfare payments for the disabled] than under the current system. The left-wing New Economics Foundation concluded that "UBI is an individualistic, monetary intervention that undermines social solidarity and fails to tackle the underlying causes of poverty, unemployment and inequality."

Academic debate 
Several British academics have been involved in the basic income debate. Among them the following:

 Stephen Hawking, an English theoretical physicist, cosmologist, and author was a supporter of a universal basic income.
 James Meade, a left-leaning economist and winner of the 1977 Nobel Memorial Prize in Economic Sciences, took part in the basic income discussion from time to time. In his last books Full Employment Regained and Agathopia he returned to the question.
 Guy Standing has been very active in the debate since the 1980s. He is now especially well known for his theory about the so-called precariat, a new social class which he thinks is growing because of globalisation, and that this development is yet another strong argument for why basic income should be implemented.
 Carole Pateman, a British political scientist, has declared that she sees basic income as a fundamental human right. For the system to reach its full potential, however, it is important that the level is not set too low.

In media 
The documentary The Cost of Living: Does Britain Need a Basic Income? – a companion piece to the film The Future of Work and Death – was released on Amazon Prime on 8 October 2020. The documentary explores the feasibility of a basic income in Britain and ultimately asks if the cost of living can be subsidised, should it be subsidised? It features welfare advisors, philosophers, economists and many basic income advocates including Guy Standing, George Monbiot, David Graeber and A. C. Grayling. The film received an online premiere screening during the COVID-19 lockdowns hosted by The Green Party.

Organisations 

The organisation Basic Income UK is "a collective of independent people promoting unconditional basic income as a progressive social policy for the United Kingdom, and beyond".

"The Citizen's Basic Income Trust promotes debate on the desirability and feasibility of a Citizen's Income by publishing a newsletter and other publications, maintaining a library of resources, and responding to requests for information". In February 2021, it launched an educational podcast exploring various ways on how UBI could tackle social issues. The trust was founded in 1984 as the Basic Income Research Group and later changed its name to CIT. The current director is Malcolm Torry, who is also the general manager of Basic Income Earth Network (BIEN).

Founded in Sheffield in 2016, the UBI Lab Network is made up of "a growing number of grassroots groups set up to examine the idea’s potential impact within a certain area and explore the launching of pilot schemes."

Chaired by Willie Sullivan, the Citizen's Basic Income Network Scotland "is a new organisation set up to raise awareness of the benefits that a Basic Income would bring to Scotland".

See also 
Tony Atkinson
Ailsa McKay

References

External links 
Basic Income Conversation
Basic Income UK
Citizen’s Basic Income Trust
UBI Podcast - Let's Try UBI by Citizen's Basic Income Trust

 
United Kingdom
Documentaries